N cell may refer to:

 N battery
 -cell (mathematics)
 The unit cube of dimension